John Scofield Live is a live album by jazz guitarist John Scofield, featuring pianist Richie Beirach, bassist George Mraz and drummer Joe LaBarbera. It was recorded on November 4th, 1977 in Munchen, Germany.

Track listing

Personnel
 John Scofield – electric guitar
 Richie Beirach – piano
 George Mraz – double bass
 Joe LaBarbera – drums

References 

1977 live albums
John Scofield live albums
Enja Records live albums